Monogenetic may refer to:

 Monogenetic in biology, of or pertaining to monogenesis (Mendelian inheritance)
 Monogenetic volcanic field in geology, a cluster of volcanoes that only erupted once
 Monogenetic theory of pidgins in linguistics, a theory about the origin of creole languages

See also
 Monogenous (disambiguation)
 Monogenic (disambiguation)
 Monogenism (disambiguation)